Robert Costello (1921-2014) was an American TV and film producer, writer, and director.

His productions include The Patty Duke Show (briefly), Dark Shadows, The Adams Chronicles, The Secret Storm, Ryan's Hope, Another World and The Doctors. He was a director of  One Life to Live.

He was born on April 26, 1921.  Costello died on May 30, 2014, at the age of 93.

Major awards 

 1977, Daytime Emmy Award for Outstanding Drama Series, Ryan's Hope 1979, Daytime Emmy Award for Outstanding Drama Series, Ryan's HopeHe was also nominated for the Daytime Emmy Award for Outstanding Drama Series in 1978 for Ryan's Hope and in 1980 for Another World.  He received nominations for the Primetime Emmy Award for Outstanding Writing for a Miniseries, Movie or a Dramatic Special in 1976 and 1977 for The Adams Chronicles''.

References 

1921 births
2014 deaths
Soap opera producers
Daytime Emmy Award winners
Place of birth missing